The 2018 Vuelta a Murcia was the 38th edition of the Vuelta a Murcia cycle race and was held on 10 February 2018. The race started in Beniel and finished in Murcia. The race was won by Luis León Sánchez of the Astana Pro Team.

General classification

References

2018
2018 UCI Europe Tour
2018 in Spanish road cycling